Plastic Bag is a short film directed by Ramin Bahrani. The film features the voice of German filmmaker Werner Herzog and an original score by Kjartan Sveinsson of the Icelandic rock band Sigur Rós. Plastic Bag premiered as the opening night film of Corto Cortissimo in the Venice Film Festival. It later screened at Telluride and the New York Film Festival. The film is part of the Independent Television Service (ITVS) online series Futurestates and was produced by Noruz Films  and Gigantic Pictures.

Plot
In a not too distant future, a Plastic Bag (voice of Werner Herzog) goes on an epic journey in search of its lost Maker, wondering if there is any point to life without her. The Bag encounters strange creatures, brief love in the sky, a colony of prophetic torn bags on a fence and the unknown. To be with its own kind, the Bag goes deep under the oceans into  of spinning garbage known as the North Pacific Trash Vortex.

Screenings
Corto Cortissimo, Venice Film Festival, 2009
Official Selection, New York Film Festival, 2009
Official Selection, Telluride Film Festival, 2009
Official Selection, South by Southwest Film Festival, 2010

References

External links 
 site about it
 
 Bahrani finds a new use for the Plastic Bag
 66th Venice Film Festival Corto Cortissimo
 Ramin Bahrani's Plastic Bag opens Venice shorts section Short Film News Network
 Gigantic Pictures
 Independent Television Service (ITVS)

2009 films
2009 short films
Environmental films
Films directed by Ramin Bahrani
2000s English-language films
American short films